The 1986 FIBA World Championship was the 10th FIBA World Championship, the international basketball world championship for men's teams. It was hosted by Spain and was held from 5 to 20 July 1986. The final phase of the tournament was held at the Palacio de Deportes de la Comunidad, Madrid. They were classified as the official men's basketball event of the 1986 Goodwill Games, held simultaneously in Moscow. This was the final tournament for West Germany, which did not participate in the next tournament prior to its unification with East Germany.

Venues

Competing nations

Squads

Preliminary round

Group A

Group B

Group C

Group D

Semifinal round

Group 1

Group 2

9th–12th classification

Semifinals

Eleventh place playoff

Ninth place playoff

5th–8th classification

Semifinals

Seventh place playoff

Fifth place playoff

Final round

Semifinals

Third place playoff

Final

Final rankings

 Teams that were eliminated in the preliminary round were all tied for 13th place, regardless of their win–loss records.
 The Philippines withdrew from the competition due to the People Power Revolution going on in their country.

All-Tournament Team

 Dražen Petrović (Yugoslavia)
 Arvydas Sabonis (USSR)
 Oscar Schmidt (Brazil)
 David Robinson (USA)
 Valeri Tikhonenko (USSR)

Top scorers (ppg)

 Nikos Galis (Greece) 33.7
 Oscar Schmidt (Brazil) 28.1
 Choong-Hee Chung Hee (South Korea) 27.8
 Dražen Petrović (Yugoslavia) 25.2
 Kim Kim (South Korea) 19.4
 Juan Antonio San Epifanio (Spain) 19.3
 Antonello Riva (Italy) 19.2
 Tan Kim Chin (Malaysia) 19.2
 Mario Butler (Panama) 19.0
 Marcel de Souza Ponickwar (Brazil) 18.0

References

External links
 
 

 
1986
International basketball competitions hosted by Spain
1986 in basketball
1986–87 in Spanish basketball